The 2020–21 Florida Gators women's basketball team represented the University of Florida during the 2020–21 NCAA Division I women's basketball season. The Gators, led by fourth-year head coach Cameron Newbauer, played their home games at the O'Connell Center and competed as members of the Southeastern Conference (SEC).

Preseason

SEC media poll
The SEC media poll was released on November 17, 2020 with the Gators selected to finish in twelfth place in the SEC.

Preseason All-SEC teams
The Gators had one player selected to the preseason all-SEC teams.

Second team

Lavender Briggs

Schedule

|-
!colspan=9 style=| Non-conference regular season

|-
!colspan=9 style=| SEC regular season

|-
!colspan=9 style=|SEC Tournament

|-
!colspan=12 style=|WNIT

References

Florida Gators women's basketball seasons
Florida
Florida Gators
Florida Gators
Florida